The 2006 FINA Diving World Cup was held in Changshu, China from July 19 to July 23, 2006.

Medal winners

Men

Women

References
 The-Sports.org: "FINA Diving World Cup Results"

External links
 www.fina.org/

FINA Diving World Cup
Fina Diving World Cup
Fina Diving World Cup
Diving competitions in China
Sport in Suzhou
International aquatics competitions hosted by China